Christopher Darrell Matthews (born 22 September 1962) is a former Australian cricketer, who played for the Australian national cricket team, Western Australia, Lancashire County Cricket Club, and Tasmania.

Matthews was a talented left arm fast bowler, who generated lively pace, and performed moderately in the Test arena. He was overshadowed by the emergence of young Queensland bowler Craig McDermott.

Matthews signed for Lancashire County Cricket Club in 1988, but only managed three matches for them. He returned to Western Australia, but failed to hold down a regular spot, and so moved to the Tasmanian Tigers in 1990, where he became highly successful, taking 119 wickets for them before retiring at the end of the 1994–95 season.

External links
 

1962 births
Living people
Australia Test cricketers
Western Australia cricketers
Tasmania cricketers
Lancashire cricketers
Australian cricketers
People from Cunderdin, Western Australia
Cricketers from Western Australia